Daniele Pecci (born 23 May 1970) is an Italian actor and director.

Born in Rome, Lazio, Pecci has worked in theater as an actor and director since 1990. He rose to prominence in 2004 when he received a main role in Orgoglio on the television channel Rai Uno. The series ran from 2004 to 2006, and he appeared in all 39 episodes.

References

External links

1970 births
Living people
Male actors from Rome
Italian male television actors
Italian male film actors
Italian male stage actors
20th-century Italian male actors
21st-century Italian male actors
Italian theatre directors